Ged Maybury is a children's book author.  He was born in Christchurch, New Zealand, in 1953, spent his childhood in Dunedin, and has been based in Australia since 2002. He has been writing books for children and young adults since 1984. He was a finalist in the AIM New Zealand Children's Book Awards 1994 with The Triggerstone, and in the NZ Post Children's Book Awards 2001; with Crab Apples. He writes science fiction, in particular of the steampunk subgenre, and humour.

In 2019, he digitally re-released his 'Horse Apples' series, including the missing fourth book: Dinosaur Apples, set in Australia. In the same year, he released five other children's books and a six-book Steampunk series “Across the Stonewind Sky”.

Bibliography
 Timetwister (also known as Time Twister), 1986
 Silicone Stew, 1990
 StarTroopers, 1991
 The Triggerstone, 1993
 The Seventh Robe, 1993
 The Rebel Masters, 1995
 Hive of the Starbees, 1995
 Horse Apples, 1998
 Crab Apples, 2000
 I Am Leatherman, 2001
 Pig Apples, 2002
 Scuttle and the Zipzaps, 2003
 Snowcave Inn, 2005
 Nosebleed, 2013 (published by Blake Education)
 Tears Before Half Time, 2019
 Girl Germs, 2019
 The Sizzlewitz List, 2019
 Horse Apples, 2019
 Crab Apples, 2019
 Pig Apples, 2019
 Dinosaur Apples, 2019
 Me Ma Supial, 2019
Steampunk Series
 Across the Stonewind Sky, 2019
 Into the Heart of Varste, 2019
 Hoverrim the Hunted, 2019
 Into the Lair of LeRoosh, 2019
 Voyage of the Silver Dawn, 2019
 Into the Queen's Domain, 2019

References

External links
 Ged Maybury's home page
 
 

1953 births
Living people
Australian science fiction writers
New Zealand science fiction writers
New Zealand children's writers
Steampunk writers